This list of tallest buildings in Panama City ranks skyscrapers in Panama City, by height.

For several years, Panama City's skyline remained largely unchanged, with only four buildings exceeding 150 m (492 feet). Beginning in the early 2000s, the city experienced a large construction boom, with new buildings rising up all over the city and two new tallest buildings since 2005. Several supertall buildings were also planned for construction;  all of these have been either cancelled (Palacio de la Bahía, and Torre Generali) or are on hold (Faros de Panamá, Torre Central).

Tallest buildings

This lists ranks Panama City skyscrapers that stand at least 150 meters (492 feet) tall, based on standard height measurement. This includes spires and architectural details but does not include antenna masts. Existing structures are included for ranking purposes based on present height. This list includes buildings under construction that have already been topped out.

Tallest under construction, approved, and proposed

Approved
This lists buildings that are approved for construction in Panama City and are planned to rise at least 150 m (492 feet).

* Table entries without text indicate that information regarding building heights, floor counts, and/or dates of completion has not yet been released.

Proposed
This lists buildings that are proposed for construction in Panama City and are planned to rise at least 150 m (492 feet).

* Table entries without text indicate that information regarding building heights, floor counts, and/or dates of completion has not yet been released.

Timeline of tallest buildings

See also
 Panhattan

References
General
Emporis.com - Panama City
Specific

External links

Diagram of Panama City skyscrapers on SkyscraperPage
New Real Estate Developments in Panama

Panama City
Panama